The Ropotamo gas field natural gas field located on the continental shelf of the Black Sea. It was discovered in 1993 and developed by PetroCeltic. It will begin production in 2018 and produces natural gas and condensates. The total proven reserves of the Ropotamo gas field are around 1.4 trillion cubic feet (40 km³), and production is slated to be around 400 million cubic feet/day (11×106m³) in 2018.

References

Black Sea energy

Natural gas fields in Bulgaria